Freeman Smith may refer to:

Freeman Smith (boxer) in 2nd AIBA American 2004 Olympic Qualifying Tournament 
Freeman Smith, character in All the Right Moves (film)

See also
Robert Freeman Smith, politician